Scoudouc is a community in New Brunswick, Canada.

The local service district takes its name from the community.

History

Places of note
Scoudouc Industrial Park.

Notable people

See also
List of communities in New Brunswick
 List of communities in Greater Moncton

Bordering communities

References

Communities in Greater Shediac
Communities in Greater Moncton
Communities in Westmorland County, New Brunswick
Designated places in New Brunswick
Local service districts of Westmorland County, New Brunswick